Lu Verne Community School District is a school district headquartered in Lu Verne, Iowa.

The district, which occupies sections of Kossuth, Hancock, and Humboldt counties, serves Lu Verne, Corwith, and Wesley.

History
In 1984, the Corwith–Wesley Community School District established a grade-sharing arrangement, in which it operated Corwith–Wesley–Lu Verne High School, with the Lu Verne district sending its secondary students there.

On July 1, 1988, the Boone Valley Community School District dissolved, with a portion transferred to the Lu Verne district.

By 2013, there were 86 students of all grade levels in the Lu Verne district and 115 students of all grade levels within the Corwith–Wesley district; districts cannot merge under Iowa law if they have fewer than 200 students total, and lower enrollments means getting less funds from the Iowa state government. At the time the two districts were trying to find a third school district for a new grade-sharing arrangement.

On July 1, 2015, the Corwith–Wesley district dissolved, with a portion of the district being reassigned to the Lu Verne district. Lu Verne received 87% of the former Corwith–Wesley territory, and most of Corwith–Wesley's elementary students were scheduled to go to Lu Verne schools. Starting in 2015, the Lu Verne district began to send its secondary students to Algona Community School District schools - Algona Middle School and Algona High School - as part of a new grade-sharing arrangement.

Enrollment

References

External links
 Lu Verne Community School District
 

School districts in Iowa
Education in Hancock County, Iowa
Education in Humboldt County, Iowa
Education in Kossuth County, Iowa